In organophosphorus chemistry, an aminophosphine is a compound with the formula R3−nP(NR2)n where R = H or an organic substituent, and n = 0, 1, 2.  At one extreme, the parent H2PNH2 is lightly studied and fragile, but at the other extreme tris(dimethylamino)phosphine (P(NMe2)3) is commonly available.  Intermediate members are known, such as Ph2PN(H)Ph.  These compounds are typically colorless and reactive toward oxygen.  They have pyramidal geometry at phosphorus.

Parent members

The fundamental aminophosphines have the formulae PH2−n(NH2)n (n = 1, 2, 3).  These species cannot be isolated in a practical quantities, although they have been examined theoretically.  H2NPH2 is predicted to be more stable than the P(V) tautomer HN=PH3.

With secondary amines, the chemistry is more straightforward.  Trisaminophosphines are prepared by treatment of phosphorus trichloride with secondary amines:
PCl3  +  6 HNMe2   →   (Me2N)3P  +  3 [H2NMe2]Cl

Aminophosphine chlorides

The amination of phosphorus trihalides occur sequentially, with each amination proceeding more slowly than the preceding:
PCl3  +  2 HNMe2   →   Me2NPCl2  +  [H2NMe2]Cl
Me2NPCl2   +  2 HNMe2   →   (Me2N)2PCl  +  [H2NMe2]Cl
With bulky amines like diisopropylamine, the selectivity for the monosubstitution improves.
Commercially available aminophosphine chlorides include dimethylaminophosphorus dichloride and bis(dimethylamino)phosphorous chloride.

Related aminophosphine fluorides compounds are available from trifluorophosphine.  The diphosphine MeN(PF2)2 is prepared from methylamine:
2 PF3  +  3 MeNH2   →   MeN(PF2)2  +  2 [MeNH3]F
Me(PF2)2 is used as a bridging ligand in organometallic chemistry.

Substituted aminophosphines are generally prepared from organophosphorus chlorides and amines. The method is used to prepare ligands for homogeneous catalysis.  Chlorodiphenylphosphine and diethylamine react to give an aminophosphine:
Ph2PCl  +  2 HNEt2   →   Ph2PNEt2  +  [H2NEt2]Cl

Primary amines react with phosphorus(III) chlorides give aminophosphines with acidic α-NH centers:
Ph2PCl  +  2 H2NR   →   Ph2PN(H)R  +  [H3NR]Cl

Reactions

Protonolysis
The P-N bond is susceptible to attack by protic reagents.  Alcoholysis occurs readily:
Ph2PNEt2  +  ROH   →   Ph2POR  +  HNEt2
The P-N bond reverts to the chloride upon treatment with anhydrous hydrogen chloride:
Ph2PNEt2  +  2 HCl   →   Ph2PCl  +  [H2NEt2]Cl

Similarly, transamination is used in the conversion of one aminophosphine to another:
P(NMe2)3 + R2NH    P(NR2)(NMe2)2  +  HNMe2
With tris(dimethylamino)phosphine is a reactant, the equilibrium can be driven by evaporation of dimethylamine.

Since the P-NR2 bond is not attacked by Grignard reagents, aminophosphine chlorides are useful reagents in the preparation of unsymmetrical tertiary phosphines.  Illustrative is the conversion of dimethylaminophosphorus dichloride to chlorodimethylphosphine:
2 MeMgBr  +  Me2NPCl2  →  Me2NPMe2  +  2 MgBrCl
Me2NPMe2  +  2 HCl  →  ClPMe2  +  Me2NH2Cl

Illustrative also is the chemistry of 1,2-bis(dichlorophosphino)benzene, a versatile precursor to diphosphine ligands, is prepared using aminophosphine reagents.  It is prepared from 1,2-dibromobenzene via lithiation and treatment with (Et2N)2PCl (Et = ethyl).  This route gives C6H4[P(NEt2)2]2, which is treated with hydrogen chloride:
C6H4[P(NEt2)2]2  +  8 HCl  →   C6H4(PCl2)2  +  4 Et2NH2Cl

Conversion to phosphenium salts
Diaminophosphorus chlorides and tris(dimethylamino)phosphine are precursors to phosphenium ions of the type [(R2N)2P]+: 
R2PCl  +  AlCl3   →   [R2P+]AlCl4−
P(NMe2)3  +  2 HOTf   →   [P(NMe2)2]OTf  +  [H2NMe2]OTf

Oxidation and quaternization
Typical aminophosphines undergo oxidation to the oxide.  Alkylation, e.g. by methyl iodide, gives the phosphonium cation.

References

Functional groups
Amides